Appooppan (also known as Charithram Aavarthikkunnilla before release) is a 1976 Indian Malayalam-language film, directed by P. Bhaskaran, starring Thikkurissy Sukumaran Nair, Jayabharathi, Sumithra and Kamal Haasan. The film was a remake of the Telugu film Tata Manavadu.

Cast 

Thikkurissy Sukumaran Nair as Velu Nair
Kamal Haasan as Babu
Jayabharathi as Bindu
Sumithra as Radha, Amminikutty (double role)
Sankaradi as Sankaran Menon
Sukumari as Bharathi
Kaviyoor Ponnamma as Sarasvathi
K. P. Ummer as Gopinath
Adoor Bhasi as Vishwanatha Menon
Prathapachandran as Money lender
Master Raghu (Karan) as young Babu
Baby Indira as young Amminikutty
Manjeri Chandran as Venu
Rajasulochana as Malini

Production 
Appooppan film was directed by P. Bhaskaran, produced by Murugan under production banner "Murugan Movies". It is a remake of the 1973 Telugu film Tata Manavadu.

The film Appooppan was announced as Charithram Aavarthikkunnilla and the film's posters and LP records covers also carried the same name. The title change to Appooppan happened just within 1 week before the theatrical release of the film. There is a misconception that Appooppan and Charitram Aavarthikkunnilla are two different films.

Soundtrack 

The film Appooppan was previously named as Charithram Aavarthikkunnilla and the LP records covers also carried the same name. The music was composed by M. S. Baburaj.

References

External links 

1970s Malayalam-language films
Films directed by P. Bhaskaran